The China Railways HXD1 (also known as the DJ4) is an eight axle high power heavy freight twin unit locomotive of axle configuration Bo'Bo'+Bo'Bo'. Both the HXD1 and HXD2 double unit locomotives were designated DJ4, the HXD2 units being disambiguated DJ4-6000.

The 7.34 billion Yuan order for 180 locomotives was given in 2004, with the first locomotive manufactured by November 2006. Production of the 180 locomotives in the class took place between 2006 and 2008. A second batch of 40 was delivered between 2009 and 2010.

In 2012 CSR began testing of a revised version of the locomotive, built by using higher levels of domestically sourced equipment. 50 units were delivered (1001 - 1050). Another unit (6001) was built at the end of 2012 by CSR Ziyang using Zhuzhou plans.

In 2013, CSR delivered 2 3xBo'Bo' to Shenhua Group (14.4 MW), directly derived from "normal" HXD1, but with a modernized driver cab. The same operator ordered 8 2xBo'Bo' in the first quarter 2013. These locomotives are dubbed the "Shenhua" Series.

In 2020, CRRC produced a 6xBo'Bo' for China Energy Investment the parent holding company of Shenhua Group. With a power output of 28.8 MW it is regarded as the worlds most powerful multi-segment electric locomotive. These locomotives are dubbed the "Shenhua 24" Series.

Background and design
The HXD1 locomotives are based on the Siemens' EuroSprinter derived design of the China Railways DJ1 locomotive.

Construction of the locomotives was carried out by Zhuzhou Electric Locomotive Company Limited. Most variants of the locomotive consists of two identical single cab Bo'Bo' units coupled together, the main locomotive body is load bearing, electric traction equipment uses an AC/DC-AC transmission chain, with the traction motors being three phase asynchronous devices. The electrical inverter for traction motor power control is an IGBT type. The traction control system is a Siemens SIBA32, units can also be operated in multiple using the Locotrol distributed traction control system.

The locomotive has a pneumatic disc brake, as well as being able to brake regeneratively.

Operations
The locomotives were built for heavy coal trains; in particular the Datong to Qinhuangdao line (Daqin Railway). On the Daqin line the twin unit locomotives typically operate in pairs and triplets, both double headed and distributed along the train.

See also
 List of locomotives in China

References

External links

 como Complete mobility, Issue 02, June 2009, pp. 14–26, via www.mobility.siemens.com (information on early 21st century developments in rail transport in China, including HXD1)
 RAILWAY TECHNOLOGY : HXD1, brief description, documents.epfl.ch

HXD1
Zhuzhou locomotives
25 kV AC locomotives
Railway locomotives introduced in 2006
Standard gauge locomotives of China